Cherga (Çargı) is a rural locality (a selo) and the administrative centre of Cherginsky Selsoviet of Shebalinsky District, the Altai Republic, Russia. The population was 1952 as of 2016. There are 23 streets.

Geography 
Cherga is located 37 km north of Shebalino (the district's administrative centre) by road. Kamlak is the nearest rural locality.

References 

Rural localities in Shebalinsky District